Sepekov is a market town in Písek District in the South Bohemian Region of the Czech Republic. It has about 1,400 inhabitants.

Administrative parts

The hamlets of Líšnice and Zálší are administrative parts of Sepekov.

Geography
It lies in the Tábor Uplands. There are several ponds in the municipal territory.

History
The first written mention of Sepekov is from 1243. The village was owned by the Rosenberg family until 1484, when they sold it to Zdeslav of Sternberg. In the 16th century, it was acquired by the Schwamberg family and joined to the Bechyně estate. When Peter Vok of Rosenberg bought this estate in 1569, it excluded Sepekov, which was joined to the Milevsko estate. Milevsko was bought by the Hodějovský of Hodějov family, but their properties were confiscated after the Battle of White Mountain in 1620. In 1623, Sepekov was donated to the Strahov Monastery.

Sights
The landmark of Sepekov is the Church of the Virgin Mary, built in the Baroque style in 1730–1733. Other monuments are vaulted corridors around the church from 1760–1767, and the rectory from 1736.

Notable people
Břetislav Benda (1897–1983), sculptor
Miloslav Vlk (1932–2017), archbishop and cardinal

References

External links

Market towns in the Czech Republic
Populated places in Písek District